Washington Rugby Football Club (WRFC) is a USA Rugby club men's Division I rugby union team based in Washington, DC.
Washington RFC formed in February, 1963.
The team founded the annual Cherry Blossom tournament in 1966.  WRFC plays in the Mid-Atlantic Conference in the Capital Geographical Union. WRFC won its first 2021 Capital Region Champion and its first debut in the Mid-Atlantic Conference for Division II. In 2022, WRFC moved from Division II to Division I Rugby.

Notable players
Note: caps and participation are accurate as of 3 August 2006

Australia Wallabies

 Mitchell Cox, scrum-half, two international caps

USA Eagles

 Bill Bernhard 1987, Fullback
 Rob Blackmore 1988(B), 1989, Prop
 Robinson Bordley 1975, 1977–1978, Fly-half, Fullback
 Mike Conroy 1977, Center
 Mike Coyner 1998-1999, Flank, 7s
 Al Dekin 1993, 7s
 Chris Doherty 1984, 1987, Center, 7s
 Michael Lancaster 1978, Prop
 Rory Lewis 1990-1991, Wing, 7s
 Dan Lyle 1993(B) 1993, Lock, 7s, 15s Captain
 Gerry McDonald 1988(B) 1989 1995-1996, Prop; Scotland U21s
 John Robbins 1988(B) Hooker
 Paul Sheehy 1991-1993, Fullback, 7s; 1991 World Cup Player
 Tom Smith 1978, 1980, Wing
 Scott Stephens 1991-1993, Flank, 7s
 George Sucher 1998, Prop; 1999 World Cup
 Kevin Swords 1985-1986, Lock
 Dan Wack 1976-1978, 1980, Center
 Ken Wood 1977-1978, 1983, Coach/Manager
 James Cassidy 2000(B), Prop
 Francois Viljoen 2004-Current, Fullback
 Owen Lentz 2006, Hooker
 PJ Komonognam 2006, USA 7s
 Andrew "Tui" Osbourne 2006, USA 7s

Honours

Division 1 ERU Champions - 1988
Blume Trophy - 1971, 1974
Division 1 MARFU 15s Champions - 1987, 1995
 Division 1 MARFU Sevens Champions - 2003
Division 1 PRU Champions - 1985, 1986, 1987, 1988, 1989, 1990, 1991, 1992, 1993
Division 2 Capital Region Champions -2021

External links
 Official Site
 USA Rugby

References

Rugby clubs established in 1963
Rugby union teams in Washington, D.C.
1963 establishments in Washington, D.C.